A number of steamships have been named Betzdorf, including: